Krahn is any of the related languages spoken by the Krahn people:
 Western Krahn language
 Eastern Krahn language
 Southern Krahn language